Minxin Pei (born 1957 in Shanghai) is a Chinese-American columnist, newspaper editor, and political scientist. He is a expert on governance in China, U.S.-East Asia relations, and democratization in developing nations. He is currently the Tom and Margot Pritzker '72 Professor of Government and George R. Roberts Fellow at Claremont McKenna College and is a non-resident senior fellow with the Asia program at the German Marshall Fund of the United States. He was formerly a senior associate with the Asia Program at the Carnegie Endowment for International Peace.

Pei earned his bachelor's degree in English from Shanghai International Studies University, and a master's degree and PhD in political science from Harvard University. In addition, he holds an M.F.A. from the University of Pittsburgh. He is a George R. Roberts Fellow and Director of the Keck Center for International and Strategic Studies.

Pei has contributed to a number of newspapers and periodicals, including The China Quarterly, The New York Times, Foreign Policy, China Today, The Diplomat, and Foreign Affairs, and is a frequent guest commentator on CNN and National Public Radio, among others.

In 2008, he was listed as one of the top 100 public intellectuals by Prospect magazine.

Publications
Following is a partial list of publications:

 From Reform to Revolution: The Demise of Communism in China and the Soviet Union (Harvard University Press, 1994) 
 China’s Trapped Transition: The Limits of Developmental Autocracy (Harvard University Press, 2006)
 The Color of China (The National Interest, March 2009)
 My Trip to Asia (Claremont Book Review, October 2011)
 China's Crony Capitalism: The Dynamics of Regime Decay (Harvard University Press, 3 October 2016)

Articles in edited books:

 "When Illusion Meets Reality: The Evolving Relationship Between China and Europe," in: Robertson-von Trotha, Caroline Y. (ed.): Europe: Insights from the Outside (= Kulturwissenschaft interdisziplinär/Interdisciplinary Studies on Culture and Society, Vol. 5), Nomos, Baden-Baden, 2011

References

External links
 China’s Trapped Transition Reconsidered

1957 births
Living people
20th-century American newspaper editors
21st-century American newspaper editors
American columnists
American political scientists
American political writers
Chinese emigrants to the United States
Claremont McKenna College faculty
Harvard University alumni
Shanghai International Studies University alumni
Writers about China
Writers from Shanghai